Dares Beach is a residential unincorporated community located in Calvert County, Maryland, United States. Dares Beach is situated along the Chesapeake Bay. It utilizes the Prince Frederick ZIP code and is approximately four miles east of the town center of Prince Frederick at the eastern terminus of MD 402. Notable residents of Dares Beach include former Maryland state senator and Patuxent River advocate Bernie Fowler, spy novelist Tom Clancy, and television/film actor Michael Willis, whose credits include HBO's The Wire and Men in Black.

References

Beaches of Maryland
Unincorporated communities in Calvert County, Maryland
Unincorporated communities in Maryland
Maryland populated places on the Chesapeake Bay
Landforms of Calvert County, Maryland